Qillwiri (Aymara qillwa, qiwña, qiwlla Andean gull, -(i)ri a suffix, also spelled Khellhuiri) is a mountain in the Andes on the border of Bolivia and Chile. On the Chilean side it is located in the Arica y Parinacota Region. It is situated in the Cordillera Occidental between the mountains Pukintika in the north-west and Lliscaya in the south-east, east of the Suriri salt flat. On the Bolivian side the mountain lies in the Oruro Department, Sabaya Province, Sabaya Municipality.

See also
 Kimsa Chata

References 

Mountains of Chile
Landforms of Arica y Parinacota Region
Mountains of Oruro Department